Daigremontianin is a bufadienolide. Bufadienolides are steroids and cardiac glycoside aglycones (meaning that they bind with carbohydrates to form cardiac glycosides) that are similar to cardenolides, differing only in the structure of the C-17 substituent on the D ring. This chemical has been found to be toxic in experiments on mice. It is one of five bufadienolides that have been isolated from Kalanchoe daigremontiana.

Toxicity
Crassulaceans are one of the prime sources of bufadienolide cardiac glycosides (including daigremontianin) responsible for an estimated 33% of cattle mortalities related to plant poisoning in South Africa. Crassulacean bufadienolides cause cardiac poisoning, but repeated small doses cause a condition called cotyledonosis, an intoxication affecting nervous and muscular systems of small animals, particularly, sheep in the Karoo area of South Africa.

References

External links
 Canadian Biodiversity Information Facility

Bufanolides
Diols
Aldehydes
Ketones